Alcheringa may refer to:

Alcheringa, an Aranda language word meaning The Dreaming, a concept in Aboriginal Australian mythology
Alcheringa (journal), an Australian palaeontology journal
Alcheringa (magazine), a magazine of ethnopoetics published from 1970 to 1980
Alcheringa (festival), an annual cultural festival held once a year at the Indian Institute of Technology, Guwahati, India
Alcheringa (TV series), 1962 Australian TV series about Aboriginal culture presented by Bill Onus 
Alcheringa Gallery, a Canadian gallery of contemporary aboriginal art